Ardmore Downtown Executive Airport  is a city-owned public-use airport located one mile (2 km) southeast of the central business district of Ardmore, a city in Carter County, Oklahoma, United States.

Facilities and aircraft 
For the 12-month period ending July 5, 2005, the airport had 11,200 general aviation aircraft operations, an average of 30 per day. There are 43 aircraft based at this airport: 74% single-engine, 14% multi-engine, 5% jet, 5% helicopter and 2% ultralight.

References

External links 

Airports in Oklahoma
Buildings and structures in Carter County, Oklahoma